Louis or Lewis Friedman or Freedman may refer to:

Louis Friedman (born 1941), American astronautics engineer
Louis L. Friedman (1906–1997), American lawyer and politician
Louis Freedman (1917–1998), British businessman, racehorse owner and breeder
Lewis Friedman, American screenwriter
Lewis Freedman, producer of Benjamin Franklin, a 1974 American television miniseries

See also
Louis Freeman (disambiguation)